is a railway station on the Chūō Main Line in Suginami, Tokyo, Japan, operated by East Japan Railway Company (JR East).

Lines
Nishi-Ogikubo Station is served by the Chūō Line (Rapid) and Chūō-Sōbu Line.

Station layout

The station has a "Midori no Madoguchi" staffed ticket office.

Platforms

History
The station opened on 15 July 1922. With the privatization of JNR on 1 April 1987, the station came under the control of JR East.

Passenger statistics
In fiscal 2010, the station was used by an average of 40,372 passengers daily (boarding passengers only).

Surrounding area
The neighbourhoods surrounding the station are characterised by narrow streets. It is primarily a residential area, with a high concentration of shops specialising in antiques and old books.

See also
 List of railway stations in Japan

References

External links
 JR East Nishi-ogikubo Station information 

Chūō Main Line
Chūō-Sōbu Line
Stations of East Japan Railway Company
Railway stations in Tokyo
Railway stations in Japan opened in 1922